Petty may refer to:

People
 Bruce Petty (born 1929), Australian political satirist and cartoonist
 Bryce Petty (born 1991), American football player
 Dini Petty (born 1945), Canadian television and radio host
 Eric D. Petty (born 1954), American politician and businessman
 Florence Petty (1870–1948), British cookery book writer and broadcaster
 George Petty (1894–1975), American pin-up artist
 J. T. Petty (born 1977), American dialogue video game writer and film director
 John Petty (disambiguation), several people
 Joseph Petty, Massachusetts politician
 Joseph H. Petty (1826–1901), New York politician
 Kathleen Petty (born 1960), Canadian news anchor
 Lori Petty (born 1963), American movie actress
 Norman Petty (1927–1984), American musician, songwriter, and record producer
 Orlando Henderson Petty (1874–1932), American Medal of Honor recipient
 Philip Petty (1840-1917), American Medal of Honor recipient
 Rebecca Petty (born c. 1970), American politician and advocate of child crime victims
 Richard E. Petty,  distinguished university professor of psychology at The Ohio State University
 Tom Petty (1950–2017), American musician
 W. Morgan Petty, a fictional writer
 William Petty (1623–1687), British economist and inventor
 William Petty, 2nd Earl of Shelburne (1737–1805), British Prime Minister and Irish peer
 An American auto racing family prominent in NASCAR:
 Lee Petty (1914–2000), family patriarch and NASCAR pioneer
 Richard Petty (born 1937), son of Lee and a NASCAR driver
 Maurice Petty (born 1939), son of Lee and a NASCAR mechanic
 Kyle Petty (born 1960), son of Richard and a NASCAR driver
 Ritchie Petty (born 1968), son of Maurice and a NASCAR driver
 Adam Petty (1980–2000), son of Kyle and a NASCAR driver

Places
 Petty France (disambiguation)
 Petty, Highland, Scotland

Others
 Petty-Fitzmaurice
 Petty Enterprises, NASCAR racing team owned by Richard and Kyle Petty
 Petty crime (misdemeanor)

See also
 
 
 Pett
 Nicholas M. Pette (1891–1988), New York politician and judge
 Petté, a town in Cameroon
 Pretty (disambiguation)

English-language surnames